Anthony "Tony" M. Young (born 1943) is an Australian mycologist based in Queensland, affiliated with the University of Queensland. He has published several books on fungi as well as a monograph on Australian Hygrophoraceae, resulting from his research on Hygrocybe and related genera. In 2007, he was a co-author of a review of the genus Ramaria in Australia, a work in progress which will see the likely description of 15 new Australian species and increase the total number to 50.

Described taxa

Amanita muriniflammea Tulloss, A.M.Young & A.E.Wood 1995
Camarophyllopsis darwinensis A.M.Young 1997
Camarophyllopsis kearneyi A.M.Young 1999
Hygrocybe anomala A.M.Young 1997
Hygrocybe aurantiocampanula A.M.Young 1997
Hygrocybe aurantipes A.M.Young 1997
Hygrocybe austrolutea A.M.Young 1997
Hygrocybe austropratensis A.M.Young 1999
Hygrocybe badioclavata A.M.Young 1997
Hygrocybe batesii A.M.Young 1997
Hygrocybe bolensis A.M.Young 2000
Hygrocybe boothii A.M.Young 2002
Hygrocybe bubalinoviscida A.M.Young 1997
Hygrocybe cerasinomutata A.M.Young 1997
Hygrocybe chromoxantha A.M.Young 1997
Hygrocybe collucera A.M.Young, R.Kearney & E.Kearney 2001
Hygrocybe cystidiorubra' A.M.Young 1997Hygrocybe dorothyae A.M.Young 1997Hygrocybe dromedensis A.M.Young 1997Hygrocybe erythrocala A.M.Young 1997Hygrocybe franklinensis A.M.Young & A.K.Mills 2002Hygrocybe fuhreri A.M.Young 2000Hygrocybe griseoramosa A.M.Young, R.Kearney & E.Kearney 2001Hygrocybe hayi A.M.Young 1997Hygrocybe hypospoda A.M.Young 2000Hygrocybe iropus A.M.Young 1997Hygrocybe kandora Grgur. & A.M.Young 1997Hygrocybe kouskosii A.M.Young 2000Hygrocybe lanecovensis A.M.Young 1999Hygrocybe leucogloea A.M.Young 1997Hygrocybe luteoconica A.M.Young 1997Hygrocybe polychroma Bougher & A.M.Young 1997Hygrocybe reesiae A.M.Young 1997Hygrocybe roseoflavida A.M.Young & A.K.Mills 2002Hygrocybe rubrolutea A.M.Young 1997Hygrocybe rubronivea A.M.Young 2000Hygrocybe saltirivula A.M.Young 2000Hygrocybe sanguineocrenulata A.M.Young 1997Hygrocybe schistophila A.M.Young 2005Hygrocybe siccitatipapillata A.M.Young 1997Hygrocybe sylvaria A.M.Young 1997Hygrocybe tidbillensis A.M.Young 1997Hygrocybe unispora A.M.Young 1997Hygrocybe vallomarginata A.M.Young 1997Hygrocybe viridiconica A.M.Young 1997Hygrocybe viscidibrunnea Bougher & A.M.Young 1997Hygrocybe watagensis A.M.Young 1997Hygrocybe wilsonensis A.M.Young 1997Hygrocybe xanthopoda A.M.Young 2000Panaeolopsis nirimbii Watling & A.M.Young 1983Panaeolus bernicis A.M.Young 1989Ramaria citrinocuspidata'' A.M.Young & N.A.Fechner 2009

Publications

See also
 List of mycologists
 Fungi of Australia

References

1943 births
Living people
Australian mycologists